Sebastiano Gastaldi (born 12 June 1991 in Piove di Sacco) is an alpine skier from Argentina. He competed for Argentina at the 2014 Winter Olympics in the slalom and giant slalom. He competed at the 2018 Winter Olympics in the men's giant slalom.

His sister is also a skier, Nicol Gastaldi.

References

External links

1991 births
Living people
Argentine male alpine skiers
Olympic alpine skiers of Argentina
Alpine skiers at the 2014 Winter Olympics
Alpine skiers at the 2018 Winter Olympics
Italian emigrants to Argentina
Sportspeople from the Province of Padua